Morning Glory is a 1993 American-Canadian drama film written by Deborah Raffin and Charles Jarrott, directed by Steven Hilliard Stern and starring Christopher Reeve and Raffin.  It is based on LaVyrle Spencer's 1989 novel of the same name.

Plot
In Depression-era America, a man (Will Parker) on parole for murder answers a newspaper advertisement for a husband. It has been placed by a widow known in the nearby town of Whitney, as 'crazy Elly'. She has two children and another is on the way; they are all by her first spouse, who died in an accident.

Will is employed at Elly's farm as a hired hand, and in the months leading up to the birth of Elly's baby they fall in love. They marry, and are very happy until Will is set up for the murder of a local waitress by his former overseer. His imprisonment and a trial follow.

With the support of his loving wife and the local librarian, Will fights for his freedom and a second chance at happiness.

Cast
Christopher Reeve as Will Parker
Deborah Raffin as Elly Dinsmore
Lloyd Bochner as Bob Collins
Nina Foch as Miss Beasly
Helen Shaver as Lula Peak
J. T. Walsh as Sheriff Reese Goodloe

Production
The film was shot on location at Jackson Farm, in Maple Ridge British Columbia.

References

External links
 
 
 

1993 films
1993 drama films
English-language Canadian films
Canadian drama films
American drama films
Films based on American novels
Films directed by Steven Hilliard Stern
Films scored by Jonathan Elias
1990s English-language films
1990s American films
1990s Canadian films